Pope Eleutherius (died 24 May 189), also known as Eleutherus, was the bishop of Rome from c. 174 to his death. His pontificate is alternatively dated to 171-185 or 177-193. He is venerated as a saint in the Catholic Church.

He is linked to a number of legends, one of them credited him with receiving a letter from "Lucius, King of Britain", but which is now generally considered to be a forgery.

Life
According to the Liber Pontificalis, he was a Greek born in Nicopolis in Epirus, Greece. His contemporary Hegesippus wrote that he was a deacon of the Roman Church under Pope Anicetus (c. 154–164), and remained so under Pope Soter, whom he succeeded around 174.

Dietary law
The 6th-century recension of Liber Pontificalis ('Book of the Popes') known as the "Felician Catalog" includes additional commentary to the work's earlier entry on Eleutherius. One addition ascribes to Eleutherius the reissuance of a decree: "And he again affirmed that no food should be repudiated by Christians strong in their faith, as God created it, [provided] however that it is sensible and edible." Such a decree might have been issued against early continuations of Jewish dietary law and against similar laws practiced by the Gnostics and Montanists. It is also possible, however, that the editor of the passage attributed to Eleutherius a decree similar to another issued around the year 500 in order to give it greater authority.

British mission

Another addition credited Eleutherius with receiving a letter from "Lucius, King of Britain" or "King of the Britons", declaring an intention to convert to Christianity. No earlier accounts of this mission have been found. It is now generally considered to be a pious forgery, although there remains disagreement over its original purpose. Haddan, Stubbs, and Wilkins considered the passage "manifestly written in the time and tone" of Prosper of Aquitaine, secretary to Pope Leo the Great in the mid-5th century, and supportive of the missions of Germanus of Auxerre and Palladius. Duchesne dated the entry a little later to the pontificate of Boniface II around 530, and Mommsen to the early 7th century. Only the last would support the conjecture that it aimed to support the Gregorian mission to the Anglo-Saxons led by Augustine of Canterbury, who encountered great difficulty with the native British Christians, as at the Synod of Chester. Indeed, the Celtic Christians invoked the antiquity of their church to generally  submission to Canterbury until the Norman conquest, but no arguments invoking the mission to Lucius appear to have been made by either side during the synods among the Welsh and Saxon bishops.

The first Englishman to mention the story was Bede and he seems to have taken it, not from native texts or traditions, but from The Book of the Popes. Subsequently, it appeared in the 9th-century History of the Britons traditionally credited to Nennius: The account relates that a mission from the pope baptised "Lucius, the Britannic king, with all the petty kings of the whole Britannic people". The account, however, dates this baptism to AD 167 (a little before Eleutherius's pontificate) and credits it to Evaristus (reigned ). In the 12th century, more details began to be added to the story. Geoffrey of Monmouth's pseudohistorical History of the Kings of Britain goes into great detail concerning Lucius and names the pope's envoys to him as Fagan and Duvian. The 12th-century Book of Llandaf placed the court of Lucius in southern Wales and names his emissaries to the pope as Elfan and Medwy.

An echo of this legend penetrated even to Switzerland. In a homily preached at Chur and preserved in an 8th- or 9th-century manuscript, Timothy is represented as an apostle to Gaul, whence he went into Roman Britain and baptised a king named Lucius, who himself became a missionary to Gaul and finally settled at Chur, where he preached the gospel with great success. In this way Lucius, the early missionary of the Swiss district of Chur, became identified with the alleged British king of the Liber Pontificalis.

Harnack suggests that in the document which the compiler of the Liber Pontificalis drew his information, the name found was not , but . Now this is the name of the fortress of Edessa. The king in question is, therefore, Lucius Ælius Septimus Megas Abgar VIII, of Edessa, a Christian king as is well known.

Death
According to the Liber Pontificalis, Pope Eleutherius died on 24 May and was buried on the Vatican Hill near the body of Peter the Apostle. Later tradition has his body moved to the church of San Giovanni della Pigna, near the pantheon. In 1591, his remains were again moved to the church of Santa Susanna at the request of Camilla Peretti, the sister of Pope Sixtus V. His feast is celebrated on 26 May.

See also

List of popes
List of Catholic saints

References

Notes

Citations

Sources

 From: 

 From:

Further reading

 
 From: 
 From: 

189 deaths
2nd-century archbishops
2nd-century Christian saints
2nd-century popes
2nd-century Romans
Greek popes
Papal saints
Popes
Saints from Roman Italy
Saints of Roman Epirus
Year of birth unknown